The Upper Millecoquins River is a  river on the Upper Peninsula of Michigan in the United States. It begins at the outlet of Millecoquins Pond in northern Mackinac County and flows generally south to Millecoquins Lake. The outlet of Millecoquins Lake is the Lower Millecoquins River which flows to Lake Michigan.

See also
List of rivers of Michigan

References

Michigan  Streamflow Data from the USGS

Rivers of Michigan
Rivers of Mackinac County, Michigan
Tributaries of Lake Michigan